Oxystoma is a genus of beetles belonging to the family Apionidae.

Species:
 Oxystoma bipartirostre
 Oxystoma cerdo
 Oxystoma craccae
 Oxystoma dimidiatum
 Oxystoma ochropus
 Oxystoma opeticum
 Oxystoma pomonae
 Oxystoma subulatum

References

Brentidae